Janina Hettich-Walz (née Hettich, born 16 June 1996) is a German biathlete. She competed at the Biathlon World Championships 2020.

Biathlon results
All results are sourced from the International Biathlon Union.

World Championships
1 medal (1 silver)

*During Olympic seasons competitions are only held for those events not included in the Olympic program.

References

External links

1996 births
Living people
German female biathletes